is a Japanese voice actress and singer associated with I'm Enterprise. She played Rena Ryūgū in Higurashi When They Cry, Nagisa Furukawa in Clannad, Seele Vollerei in Honkai Impact 3rd, and Akagi in Azur Lane. She performed theme songs for each series, some of which have charted on Oricon.

Filmography

Television

Film

Video games

Dubbing

Other

Drama CDs

Discography

Studio albums

Singles

References

External links
 I'm Enterprise profile 
  
 Mai Nakahara at Oricon 
 
 
 

1981 births
Living people
Anime singers
I'm Enterprise voice actors
Japanese radio personalities
Japanese video game actresses
Japanese voice actresses
Japanese women pop singers
Voice actresses from Hyōgo Prefecture
21st-century Japanese actresses
21st-century Japanese women singers
21st-century Japanese singers